Nataliya Rusnachenko (born 13 May 1969) is a Ukrainian former handball player who competed for the Soviet Union in the 1988 Summer Olympics and for Austria in the 1992 Summer Olympics and in the 2000 Summer Olympics.

She was born in Tiraspol, Moldavian Soviet Socialist Republic. She represented the Moldavian SSR at the 1986 Spartakiad in Kiev and played for Spartak Kiev.

In 1988 she won the bronze medal with the Soviet team. She played one match as goalkeeper.

Four years later she was a member of the Austria team which finished fifth in the 1992 Olympic tournament. She played three matches as goalkeeper.

At the 2000 Games she finished fifth with the Austrian team in the Olympic tournament. She played all seven matches as goalkeeper.

References

External links
profile

1969 births
Living people
Soviet female handball players
Moldovan female handball players
Ukrainian female handball players
Austrian female handball players
Olympic handball players of the Soviet Union
Olympic handball players of Austria
Handball players at the 1988 Summer Olympics
Handball players at the 1992 Summer Olympics
Handball players at the 2000 Summer Olympics
Olympic bronze medalists for the Soviet Union
Olympic medalists in handball
People from Tiraspol
Sportspeople from Kyiv
Spartak athletes
Medalists at the 1988 Summer Olympics
Honoured Masters of Sport of the USSR
Soviet emigrants to Austria
Ukrainian emigrants to Austria